Sanmai may refer to:
 Sanmai (cicada), an extinct genus of cicadas
 San mai, blade-making technique